Pseudophilautus cavirostris, commonly called hollow-snouted shrub frog, is a species of frog in the family Rhacophoridae. It is endemic to Sri Lanka.

Its natural habitats are subtropical or tropical moist lowland forests and subtropical or tropical moist montane forests. It is threatened by habitat loss.

References

cavirostris
Frogs of Sri Lanka
Endemic fauna of Sri Lanka
Amphibians described in 1869
Taxa named by Albert Günther
Taxonomy articles created by Polbot